Simon Porte Jacquemus (born 16 January 1990) is a French fashion designer and the founder of the Jacquemus fashion label.

Early life
Jacquemus was born in Salon-de-Provence, France into a relatively poor family of farmers; his father occasionally  sang in metal bands and his mother raised him. He grew up in the small town of Mallemort in southern France.

In 2008, at the age of 18, he went to Paris, where he studied for a few months at the École supérieure des arts et techniques de la mode (ESMOD) like Olivier Rousteing.  He then left the program for a position of an artist manager's assistant at Citizen K fashion magazine. The sudden death of his mother prompted him to begin his own career as a fashion designer.

Career
He was 20 years old when he created his brand Jacquemus, his mother's maiden name. He promoted his designs by having friends wear his creations in shops during Vogue'''s Fashion Night Out in 2010 in Paris. In 2012, he was invited to present his collection during Paris Fashion Week.

Most of the fabrics used in his collections come from a workwear supplier. The cut is simple, with few details, but original. The prints sometimes recall the world of films by Jacques Tati or Louis Malle. He has described his creations as a "naïve" fashion with a pop of color with unique silhouettes. Having achieved a certain notoriety, his pieces are now on sale in stores such as Opening Ceremony in New York, Broken Arm in Paris, Gago in Aix-en-Provence and Dover Street Market in London. In 2014, he designed a collection for La Redoute. In 2015, he received the Special Jury Prize at the LVMH Prize, an international competition created by Delphine Arnault for young fashion designers.

In 2017, Jacquemus added a line of footwear to his collections. He also announced in 2018 that he would be designing menswear, creating the line in 2019. In addition to shoes, Jacquemus also designs handbags and hats.

His contribution to his native region is in the opening of the restaurant "Citron", located in the new Galleries Lafayette des Champs-Elysees, launched on 28 March 2019 instead of the former Virgin Megastore12.

On 24 June 2019 he organised a parade to celebrate the ten years of the brand. Simon Porte invited the world of fashion to a lavender field and presented his new collection Le coup de soleil''.

His Spring/Summer 2021 collection, "L'Amour", had themes of simplicity and romance. "Like a simple country wedding or a harvest festival", he said in a pre-show interview. The show took place in a wheat field an hour outside of Paris, and due to the COVID-19 pandemic, only had 100 guests in attendance. 

Nike announced its newest women's-focused collection with Jacquemus with the collaborative capsule first previewed in mid-May 2022. "Having this imagery in mind, we designed women's athletic wear with sensuous details and neutral colors, along with my own interpretation of the Humara, my favorite Nike shoe", said Simon Porte Jacquemus when asked about the inspiration behind the footwear pieces.

Personal life
Jacquemus is openly gay. He married Italian digital agent Marco Maestri, on 28 August 2022 at the town hall of Charleval, Bouches-du-Rhône.

Awards
 2014 Finalist, LVMH Prize
 2015 Special Jury LVMH Prize
2017 Fashion Director's Choice Award at the Elle Style Awards

References

External links
 

1990 births
French fashion designers
French gay artists
LGBT fashion designers
Living people